Goncharenko, also transliterated Goncharenko, is an occupation-related surname of Ukrainian origin. Derived from гончар, it means descendant of a potter. The Belarusian-language version is Hancharenka/Hančarenka.

People

Goncharenko
 Goncharenko brothers, Ukrainian bandura-makers 
 Agapius Goncharenko (1832–1916), Ukrainian priest and human rights activist
 Artem Goncharenko (born 1979), Ukrainian swimmer
 Hnat Goncharenko (1835– 1917), Ukrainian musician
 Makar Goncharenko (1912–1997), Soviet-Ukrainian footballer and coach
 Oleksiy Goncharenko (born 1980), Ukrainian politician
 Roman Goncharenko (born 1993), Ukrainian footballer
 Stanislav Goncharenko (born 1960), Soviet-Ukrainian footballer

Goncharenko
 Aleksandr Goncharenko (born 1959), Kazakhstani football official
 Andrey Goncharenko, Russian billionaire businessman
 Angelina Goncharenko (born 1994), Russian ice hockey player
 Oleg Goncharenko (1931–1986), Soviet-Ukrainian speed skater
 Svetlana Goncharenko (born 1971), Russian runner
 Viktor Goncharenko (born 1977), Belarusian football manager

See also
 
 
 Honchar

Ukrainian-language surnames
Occupational surnames